Jamie Bain (born 8 December 1989) is a former professional Scottish darts player who played in Professional Darts Corporation events.

He first won a PDC Tour Card in 2014, and after it expired in 2016, he had to wait until 2017 to win it back. Once again, Bain lost his Tour Card at the end of its two-year spell in November 2018, but managed to finish on the top eleven of the UK Q-School Order of Merit in January 2019 to seal at least another two years on the ProTour.

After another year of struggles in 2019 on the tour, Bain resigned his Tour Card for the 2020 season due to other commitments, saying he would prefer someone else to get his place and use it fully.

References

External links
Profile and stats on Darts Database

1989 births
Living people
Scottish darts players
Sportspeople from Aberdeen
Professional Darts Corporation former tour card holders